Mallee Boy is the sixth studio album by Australian country music artist John Williamson. The album was released in November 1986 and peaked at number 9 on the Kent Music Report; becoming Williamson's first top ten album.

At the inaugural ARIA Music Awards of 1987, the album won ARIA Award for Best Country Album.
At the 1987 Country Music Association of Australia, the album won Album of the Year. At the 1988 awards, the album won Top Selling Album.

Reception and legacy
In 2014, Chris Johnston from Sydney Morning Herald said "The best John Williamson songs on his best album Mallee Boy are among the finest representations of (and romances with) Australia in our culture." adding "Mallee Boy's wonderful "Galleries of Pink Galahs", "Raining on the Rock", "True Blue" and "Cootamundra Wattle" are superb, poignant songs about the beauties and paradoxes of this country.".

Track listing

Chart positions

Weekly charts

Year-end charts

Release history

References

1986 albums
Festival Records albums
John Williamson (singer) albums
ARIA Award-winning albums